Hopeless Pictures is an American animated comedy series starring the voice of Friends actress Lisa Kudrow, Seinfeld guest actor Bob Balaban, and produced and broadcast by the IFC. The cartoon follows fictional film producer Mel Wax, voiced by Michael McKean, in a spoof of the Hollywood movie industry. Stylistically the show makes use of the audio from scripted telephone conversations combined with on-screen gags surrounding the cartoon characters speaking.

References

External links
 

2000s American adult animated television series
2000s American parody television series
2005 American television series debuts
2005 American television series endings
American adult animated comedy television series
American flash adult animated television series
English-language television shows
IFC (American TV channel) original programming